"I'm the Leader of the Gang (I Am)" is a song by English glam rock singer Gary Glitter, written by Glitter with Mike Leander and produced by Mike Leander. It was Glitter's first number-one single on the UK Singles Chart, spending four weeks at the top of the chart in July 1973.

Description
The song "I'm the Leader of the Gang (I Am)" was a top hit for Gary Glitter; it reached number-one in the UK Singles Chart in July and August 1973. It was written by Gary Glitter and Mike Leander and produced by Mike Leander. As a result of its popularity, Glitter's nickname became "The Leader", and his 1991 autobiography was titled Leader.

A glam rock anthem typical of Glitter's early 1970s output, the melody is based on a simple mid-tempo rhythm (the so-called "Glitter Stomp") and loud chanted backing vocals such as "Hey!" and "Come on, come on!". Glitter had a backing band, the Glitter Band; however, with the exception of saxophonists Harvey Ellison and John Rossall, they did not participate in his recording sessions, and precisely who else, if anyone, helped Glitter and producer/co-writer Mike Leander in the studio remains unknown. Glitter said in interviews that he and Leander preferred to play everything themselves, since it allowed them to record the songs as they were being written.

The song became a concert favourite with the crowd chanting the "Come on, come on!" refrain before Glitter took to the stage. Although Glitter's version failed to chart in the U.S., the following year a version by Brownsville Station made the Top 30 on the Cashbox Top 100 and reached No. 48 on the Billboard Hot 100.

In 1986, still a popular live act, Glitter re-recorded the song with heavy metal band Girlschool. This version missed the UK charts but reached No.8 on the indie chart Show Heavy Metal charts.

In 1997, girl group Spice Girls covered the song for their musical comedy film Spice World. Glitter originally made a cameo appearance, but his scene was deleted after his child pornography possession arrest. A bootleg of the scene surfaced some time later. The Full Monty, another 1997 British comedy, used the song as well.

Track listing
"I'm the Leader of the Gang (I Am)" – 3:25
"Just Fancy That" – 2:36

Peter and the Test Tube Babies cover

In 1982, the Peacehaven's punk band Peter and the Test Tube Babies covered the song on their album Pissed and Proud.

Green Jellÿ cover

In 1993, comedy rock band Green Jellÿ released "I'm the Leader of the Gang (I Am)", with professional wrestler Hulk Hogan singing lead vocals. The release scored the band a second Top 40 hit in the United Kingdom, reaching no. 25 on the UK Singles Chart.

Track listing

References

External links
 

1973 singles
1993 singles
Gary Glitter songs
UK Singles Chart number-one singles
Songs written by Mike Leander
Song recordings produced by Mike Leander
Comedy rock songs
Songs written by Gary Glitter
Green Jellÿ songs
1973 songs